Everything is all that exists.

Everything may also refer to:

 Universe, everything humans perceive to exist
 Cosmos, the universe as an orderly system
 World, the planet Earth, or the sum of human civilization
 everything, an English indefinite pronoun

Music
 Everything (band), an American rock band

Albums
 Everything (Addictiv album) or the title song, 2009
 Everything (The Bangles album), 1988
 Everything (Climie Fisher album), 1987
 Everything (Faye Wong album) or the title song, 1990
 Everything (Henry Rollins album) or the title track, 1996
 Everything (Jason McCoy album), 2011
 Everything (Joe album) or the title song, 1993
 Everything (Mr. Children album), 1992
 Everything (P-Money album) or the title song (see below), 2010
 Everything (R. Stevie Moore album), 1984
 Everything (Teenage Jesus and the Jerks album), 1995
 Everything! (Tones on Tail album), 1998 
 Everything (EP) or the title song, by Chely Wright, 2004
 Everything, by Lido, 2016
 Everything or the title song, a DVD by Lifehouse, 2005

Songs
 "Everything" (Alanis Morissette song), 2004
 "Everything" (Anna Vissi song), 2006
 "Everything" (Arashi song), 2009
 "Everything" (Buckcherry song), 2007
 "Everything" (Dum Dums song), 2000
 "Everything" (Fefe Dobson song), 2004
 "Everything" (INXS song), 1997
 "Everything" (Jody Watley song), 1989
 "Everything" (M2M song), 2001
 "Everything" (Mary J. Blige song), 1997
 "Everything" (Michael Bublé song), 2007
 "Everything" (Misia song), 2000
 "Everything" (Nine Inch Nails song), 2013
 "Everything" (P-Money song), 2008
 "Everything" (Sebastian Walldén song), 2018
 "Everything" (TobyMac song), 2018
 "Everything (It's You)", by Mr. Children, 1997
 "Everything (Take Me Down)", by Dane Rumble, 2010
 "Everything", by Bitter:Sweet from Drama, 2008
 "Everything", by Canela Cox, 2001
 "Everything", by Collective Soul from Disciplined Breakdown, 1997
 "Everything", by A Cursive Memory, 2008
 "Everything", by Eleanor Friedberger from Rebound, 2018
 "Everything", by Ella Mai from Ella Mai, 2018
 "Everything", by G Herbo from Humble Beast, 2017
 "Everything", by Hardline from Double Eclipse, 1992
 "Everything", by Jeremy Camp from Beyond Measure, 2006
 "Everything", by The Juliana Theory from Love, 2003
 "Everything", by Lauren Daigle from Look Up Child
 "Everything", by Lil Wayne from Lights Out, 2000
 "Everything", by Limp Bizkit from Three Dollar Bill, Y'all, 1997
 "Everything", by Michelle Williams from Heart to Yours, 2002
 "Everything", by Michelle Williams from Journey to Freedom, 2014
 "Everything", by Nas from Nasir, 2018
 "Everything", by Neverest, 2011
 "Everything", by Passenger from Young as the Morning, Old as the Sea, 2016
 "Everything", by Sam Sparro, 2019
 "Everything", by Shihad (as Pacifier) from Pacifier, 2002
 "Everything", by Snoop Dogg from 220, 2018
 "Everything", by SS501, 2005
 "Everything", by Stacie Orrico from Genuine, 2000
 "Everything", by Status Quo from Ma Kelly's Greasy Spoon, 1970
 "Everything", by Stereo Fuse from Stereo Fuse, 2002
 "Everything", by Superfruit from Future Friends, 2017
 "Everything", by Taproot from Welcome, 2002
 "Everything", by Tiësto from Elements of Life, 2007
 "Everything", by When in Rome from When in Rome, 1988
 "Everything (All at Once)", by Arcane Roots from Melancholia Hymns, 2017
 "Everything (Between Us)", by Liz Phair from Somebody's Miracle, 2005

Other uses
 Everything (film), a 2004 British film directed by Richard Hawkins
 Everything (software), a desktop search engine for Windows NTFS drives
 Everything (video game), a 2017 video game
 Everything2, a web-based community
 The Everything Card, an early credit card

See also
 Cosmos (disambiguation)
 Everything, Everything (disambiguation)
 Universal quantification, in logic, denotes a statement that is true for everything
 Universe (disambiguation)
 World (disambiguation)